Diethylhydroxylamine (DEHA) is an organic compound with the formula (C2H5)2NOH. Strictly, this is N,N-diethylhydroxylamine. It has an isomer, N,O-diethylhydroxylamine with the formula EtNHOEt. N,N-diethylhydroxylamine is a colorless liquid, although it is usually encountered as a solution.  It is mainly used as an oxygen scavenger in water treatment.

It is a volatile oxygen scavenger and reacts in a ratio of 2.8/1 DEHA/O2.  It is employed in high pressure (>70 bar) boiler systems due to a very low rate of reaction at low temperatures and pressures. Due to its volatility, it acts as an oxygen scavenger throughout the entire boiler system due to steam carryover. DEHA also reacts with ferrous metals to form a passivized film of magnetite throughout the boiler system.

It has these other uses:
Polymerisation inhibitor
Color stabilizer (photographics)
Corrosion inhibitor
Discoloration inhibitor (phenolics)
Antiozonant
Radical scavenger

References

Hydroxylamines
Corrosion inhibitors